Pom is an Eastern Malayo-Polynesian language spoken on Miosnum Island in Cenderawasih Bay west of Serui Island,  in Papua Province of Western New Guinea, northeastern Indonesia.  It has around 2000 speakers. This wordlist was recorded by Emily Gasser with Pom speakers Yanselt Borotabui, Spenyei Awendu, Frengky Mantundoi, Frence Kapitaray, and Memase Kadwaru on the Unipa campus in Manokwari in June/July 2016.

References

South Halmahera–West New Guinea languages
Languages of western New Guinea
Cenderawasih Bay
Papua (province) culture